Fonzy is a 2013 French comedy film about a fish deliveryman in Paris becomes involved in a legal battle with his sperm donation children. The film is a remake of the Quebecois film Starbuck (2011).

Plot
Twenty years ago, Diego Costa, under the pseudonym "Fonzy", repeatedly donated sperm to the sperm bank. Today, at 42, he is a deliveryman in a family-owned fishmonger and leads a teenage irresponsible and blundering life. While his wife Elsa learns that she is pregnant, his past resurfaces. Diego discovers he is the father of 533 children, 142 of them want to know who is Fonzy.

Cast
 José Garcia as Diego
 Audrey Fleurot as Elsa
 Lucien Jean-Baptiste as Quentin
 Gérard Hernandez as Ramon
 Arnaud Tsamere as Maître Chasseigne
 Alice Belaïdi as Sybille
 François Civil as Hugo
 Alison Wheeler as Alix
 Pablo Pauly as Pablo

References

External links

 - Hollywood Reporter

2013 comedy films
2013 films
French comedy films
2010s French-language films
Films set in France
Films shot in France
Remakes of Canadian films
Films about sperm donation
2010s French films
French pregnancy films